The Radical SR9 is a sports prototype race car, designed, developed and produced by Radical for sports car racing, built to LMP2 regulations, produced in 2006.

References

Rear mid-engine, rear-wheel-drive vehicles
Cars of England
Sports cars
2000s cars